Karapınar, Polatlı is a village in the District of Polatlı, Ankara Province, Turkey.  The village is 4 km away from Polatlı town center and 69 km to Ankara.

The village is populated by Kurds and Tatars.

References

Villages in Polatlı District

Kurdish settlements in Ankara Province